The 2014 Rugby League Four Nations tournament was the fourth staging of the Rugby League Four Nations tournament played in Australia and New Zealand over three weeks from Saturday, 25 October to Saturday, 15 November 2014. The series was contested by regular participants Australia, England and New Zealand, joined by Samoa, having won their Pacific qualifier against Fiji. New Zealand won the tournament, defeating Australia in the final at Wellington's Westpac Stadium on Saturday 15 November.

History 
The 2014 tournament is the first Four Nations series to be scheduled following the 2013 Rugby League World Cup, with the venues rotating between Europe and the South Pacific.

In addition to automatic inclusions Australia, England and New Zealand, Pacific nations Fiji and Samoa met in a mid-season test match at the Penrith Stadium in western Sydney to determine the fourth entrant in the tournament. Samoa won an entertaining match 32-16 in front of 9,063 fans.

The 34,500 capacity Westpac Stadium in Wellington will play host to the first Four Nations Final played in New Zealand. The last time the final of the tournament was held in New Zealand was at the Mount Smart Stadium in Auckland when the tournament was known as the Tri-Nations in its inaugural year, 1999.

Venues 
The games were played at the following venues in Australia and New Zealand. The tournament final was played in Wellington.

Referees 
 Henry Perenara (Referee and Video Referee - New Zealand)
 Phil Bentham (Referee - England)
 Gerard Sutton (Referee - Australia)
 Ben Cummins (Replacement Referee - Australia)

Touch judges/video referees 
 Anthony Eliott (Touch Judge - New Zealand)
 Grant Atkins (Touch Judge - Australia)
 Jason Walsh (Touch Judge - Australia)
 Robert Hicks (Touch Judge - England)
 Ian Smith (Video Referee - England)
 Bernard Sutton (Video Referee - Australia)

Participating nations

Squads

Qualifier

Samoa v. Fiji 

 Samoa qualified for main tournament

Results

Round 1 

 Ben Roberts made his 10th appearance for Samoa, only the second player to hit double-digit appearances for his country with George Carmont being the first.

 Dallin Watene-Zelezniak could have made his international test debut in the starting XIII for New Zealand on the right-wing, but was ruled out for the game and for the rest of the tournament with an ankle injury and Gerard Beale replaced him.
 Jason Taumalolo made his international test debut for New Zealand.
 Daniel Tupou, Josh Mansour, Dylan Walker, Aaron Woods and Aidan Guerra made their international test debut for Australia
 With the victory, this was New Zealand's first Test win over Australia since the 2010 Four Nations Final.

Round 2 

 Suaia Matagi made his international test debut for New Zealand
 Tautau Moga and Dominique Peyroux made their international test debut for Samoa
 With the victory, New Zealand retained the Peter Leitch QSM Challenge Trophy.

 Perth born Dan Sarginson made his international test début for England.
 Ben Hunt and David Klemmer made their international test debuts for Australia.
 Sione Mata'utia also made his international test début for Australia and becoming the youngest ever player to play for Australia at aged 18 years and 129 days, eclipsing Israel Folau's seven-year-old record by 65 days.
 Cameron Smith becomes the 6th Kangaroo-Test player, to play 40-Test games for Australia.

Round 3 

 With the victory, New Zealand secured a place in the final.

 Josh Jackson made his international test debut for Australia.
 With the victory, Australia secured a place in the final.

Standings

Final 

Score Progression: 11th: Australia 6 - 0 (Jennings Try, Smith Goal) 23rd: Even 6 - 6 (Nightingale Try, Johnson Goal) 29th: New Zealand 8 - 6 (Johnson Penalty Goal) 35th: New Zealand 14 - 6 (Vatuvei Try, Johnson Goal) 42nd: New Zealand 14 - 12 (Mata'utia Try, Smith Goal) 58th: New Zealand 18 - 12 (Johnson Try) 63rd: New Zealand 22 - 12 (Vatuvei Try) 76th: New Zealand 22 - 18 (Hunt Try, Smith Goal)

Match records:
 This was Australia's first game at Wellington's Westpac Stadium since 2007, when they beat New Zealand 58-0.
 This was New Zealand's first home game at Wellington's Westpac Stadium since the 2010 Four Nations Round 1 clash with England, when they won 24-10.
 With the victory, New Zealand won this year's Four Nations Title, as well as their second Tournament Title.
 New Zealand became the second team since Australia (in the 2011 Four Nations series), to go through the tournament undefeated.
 New Zealand won 2 consecutive matches against Australia, for the first time since 1998.
 New Zealand earned their first victory over Australia at a home venue since 2003, when they won 30-16 over Australia at Auckland's North Harbour Stadium.
 Manu Vatuvei becomes New Zealand's all-time leading try-scorer, passing Nigel Vagana's record (of 19 tries) after scoring his second try in the game for a total of 20 test tries.
 Simon Mannering became the fifth Kiwi-Test player to play 40 tests for New Zealand.

Player statistics

Broadcasting rights 
In the United Kingdom, Premier Sports televised all the matches live while BBC Two televised England's round robin matches and the final live. BBC One televised highlights of matchday one while BBC Two televised highlights of matchday two while BBC One televised highlights of England's final round robin match against New Zealand while highlights of matchday three was televised on BBC Two in England and England HD at 10:00pm and in Northern Ireland at 10:30pm and in Scotland 11:00pm and in Wales at 11:30pm. BBC One televised highlights of the final.

References

External links 

Rugby League Four Nations
International rugby league competitions hosted by New Zealand
International rugby league competitions hosted by Australia
Four Nations
Four Nations
Four Nations
Four Nations